Debian-Installer is a system installer designed for the Debian Linux distribution. It originally appeared in the Debian release 3.1 (Sarge), released on June 6, 2005, although the first release of a Linux distribution that used it was Skolelinux (Debian-Edu) 1.0, released in June 2004.

It is also one of two official installers available for Ubuntu, the other being called Ubiquity (itself based on parts of debian-installer) which was introduced in Ubuntu 6.06 (Dapper Drake).

It makes use of cdebconf (a re-implementation of debconf in C) to perform configuration at install time.

Originally, it was only supported under text-mode and ncurses. A graphical front-end (using GTK-DirectFB) was first introduced in Debian 4.0 (Etch). Since Debian 6.0 (Squeeze), it is used over Xorg instead of DirectFB.

debootstrap
debootstrap is software which allows installation of a Debian base system into a subdirectory of another, already installed operating system. It needs access to a Debian repository and doesn't require an installation CD. It can also be installed and run from another operating system or to create a "cross-debootstrapping", a rootfs for a machine of a different architecture, for instance, OpenRISC. There is also a largely equivalent version written in C – cdebootstrap, which is used in debian-installer.

debootstrap can be used to install Debian in a system without using an installation disk but can also be used to run a different Debian flavor in a chroot environment. This way it is possible to create a full (minimal) Debian installation which can be used for testing purposes, or for building packages in a "clean" environment (e.g., as pbuilder does).

Features
 Set language
 Select location
 Configure keyboard
 Configure network
 Setup users and passwords
 Configure clock
 Partition disk
 Create partition
 Format device
 LVM/Cryptsetup
 Install system base
 Configure package manager
 Configure mirrorlist
 Configure bootloader

See also

 Anaconda
 Calamares
 Ubiquity
 Wubi

References

External links
 

Debian
Free software programmed in C
Linux installation software
Software that uses GTK